Rudolf Maximilian Butler, RIAI, FRIBA, RSAI, RHA, RIA, (30 September 1872 – 3 February 1943) was a well-known Irish Roman Catholic ecclesiastical architectural historian, academic, journalist, and architect of Dublin active, throughout late-nineteenth-century to mid-twentieth-century Ireland. He resided and worked at 23 Kildare Street, Dublin until he designed a new residence for himself at 73, Ailesbury Road. He was brought up a Moravian and may have remained in that faith throughout his life, however, he designed all of his churches for the Roman Catholic Church, particularly for the Passionist Fathers. He was a founding member of the AAI in 1896, editor of the Irish Builder from 1899 to 1935, and  professor of architecture at University College, Dublin.

The RM Butler Architect Collection which covers both his work and his research into James Gandon is held by the library of  University College Cork.

Works

 1907: Sacred Heart Church in Castletownbere
 1910: St. Colman's Church on Inishbofin, County Galway
 1920: His residence at 73 Ailesbury Road.
 1923–1926: Remodeled St. Dympna’s Roman Catholic Church, Tedavnet, County Monaghan (Ref. 41400604)
 1922–1923: St Michael’s Church, Annyalla, Co Monaghan: completion of a commission of William A Scott.
 1923–1926: St. Joseph's Church, Letterfrack
 1924–1925: Rebuilt St. Mary's Roman Catholic Church,  Threemilehouse, County Monaghan.
 1927: Remodeling and extension of Church of Our Lady and St. Kieran, Ballylooby

References

External links 

 Guide to the Influence of Climate and Material on National Domestic Architecture : An Essay Awarded the Prize of the Architectural Association of Ireland 1896

1872 births
1943 deaths
Architects from Dublin (city)
Irish ecclesiastical architects
Architects of Roman Catholic churches
Academics of University College Dublin
Fellows of the Royal Institute of British Architects